Andreas Buck (born 29 December 1967) is a German former professional footballer who played as a midfielder.

Honours
VfB Stuttgart
 Bundesliga: 1991–92
 DFB-Pokal: 1996–97
 DFL-Supercup: 1992

1. FC Kaiserslautern
 Bundesliga: 1997–98

References

External links
 

1967 births
Living people
German footballers
Association football midfielders
VfL Kirchheim/Teck players
SC Freiburg players
VfB Stuttgart players
1. FC Kaiserslautern players
1. FSV Mainz 05 players
Bundesliga players
2. Bundesliga players
West German footballers
People from Göppingen (district)
Sportspeople from Stuttgart (region)
Footballers from Baden-Württemberg